Mademoiselle from Armentieres is a 1926 British World War I silent drama film directed by Maurice Elvey and starring Estelle Brody, John Stuart and Alf Goddard. The film was Elvey's first collaboration with screenwriter Victor Saville. It was followed by a 1928 sequel Mademoiselle Parley Voo.

Plot
The unnamed Mademoiselle (Brody) helps her aunt to run a restaurant in Armentières.  British soldier Johnny (Stuart) has fallen in love with her, and she shows signs of reciprocation.  The local liaison officer asks Mademoiselle whether she can find out anything about a customer named Branz, who has aroused suspicion.  By working her charms on him to gain his confidence, she discovers that he is a German spy.  Mademoiselle has to keep her mission secret to avoid giving away her real motives.  However Johnny misinterprets the attention she pays to Brandt, assuming her to be fickle.

Johnny is summoned to the fighting line before Mademoiselle can explain herself.  Once she has fulfilled her mission, she goes in search of Johnny to put him in the picture.  She finds his regiment in a captured German trench, with Johnny wounded.  Then the trench is recaptured by the Germans with Branz in tow.  Things look bleak until the British forces counter-attack and once again take the trench, killing Branz in the process.  Mademoiselle and Johnny are trapped when the trench wall collapses, but manage to extricate themselves and look forward to their future together.

Cast
 Estelle Brody as Mademoiselle
 John Stuart as Johnny
 Marie Ault as Aunt
 Gabriel Rosca as Branz
 Alf Goddard as Fred
 Clifford Heatherley as Interrogator
 Humberston Wright as Old Soldier
 Boris Ranevsky as Liaison Officer

Later history
The film opened in London in September 1926 and was still playing in cinemas around the country until well into 1927.  It was reportedly the most profitable British film of 1926 and made an instant star of Brody.

The British Film Institute holds fragments amounting to around one third of the film in the BFI National Archive, but the remaining two thirds cannot be found and the film as a whole is classed as "missing, believed lost".  It is included on the BFI's "75 Most Wanted" list of missing British feature films.

References

External links 
 BFI 75 Most Wanted entry, with extensive notes
 

1926 romantic drama films
British romantic drama films
British silent feature films
British spy drama films
British black-and-white films
Films directed by Maurice Elvey
Films set in France
Lost British films
Western Front (World War I) films
World War I spy films
1920s spy drama films
Films produced by Victor Saville
Films with screenplays by Victor Saville
1926 films
1926 lost films
1920s British films
Silent romantic drama films
Silent war films
Lost war films